Several trees in Scotland have been named the Wallace Oak for their association with William Wallace:

Wallace Oak (Elderslie)
Wallace Oak (Port Glasgow)
Wallace Oak (Torwood)